The North and South Marine Parks are national parks off the eastern coast of Andros, the Bahamas.

Flora and fauna
The parks contain a barrier reef with associated coral and other wildlife.

References

National parks of the Bahamas
Andros, Bahamas